Svavar Guðnason (18 November 1909 – 25 June 1988) was an Icelandic painter active in the avant-garde movement COBRA.

References
Listasafn Íslands. 1990. Svavar Guðnason 1909 – 1988, pp. 7-8.

Svavar Gudnason
Svavar Gudnason
1909 births
1988 deaths
Modern painters
Abstract painters